The 1967 Arizona State Sun Devils baseball team represented Arizona State University in the 1967 NCAA University Division baseball season. The team was coached by Bobby Winkles in his 9th season at Arizona State.

The Sun Devils won the College World Series, defeating the Houston Cougars in the championship game.

Roster

Schedule 

! style="background:#FFB310;color:#990033;"| Regular Season
|- valign="top" 

|- align="center" bgcolor="#ddffdd"
| February 24 ||  || 14–0 || 1–0 || –
|- align="center" bgcolor="#ddffdd"
| February 25 || San Fernando State || 8–5 || 2–0 || –
|- align="center" bgcolor="#ddffdd"
| February 25 || San Fernando State || 7–4 || 3–0 || –
|- align="center" bgcolor="#ddffdd"
| March 2 ||  || 11–5 || 4–0 || –
|- align="center" bgcolor="#ddffdd"
| March 3 || Cal State LA || 8–4 || 5–0 || –
|- align="center" bgcolor="#ddffdd"
| March 4 || Cal State LA || 8–2 || 6–0 || –
|- align="center" bgcolor="#ddffdd"
| March 4 || Cal State LA || 8–4 || 7–0 || –
|- align="center" bgcolor="#ddffdd"
| March 9 ||  || 2–1 || 8–0 || –
|- align="center" bgcolor="#ddffdd"
| March 10 ||  || 12–4 || 9–0 || –
|- align="center" bgcolor="#ddffdd"
| March 11 || Long Beach State || 7–6 || 10–0 || –
|- align="center" bgcolor="#ffdddd"
| March 11 || Long Beach State || 4–5 || 10–1 || –
|- align="center" bgcolor="#ddffdd"
| March 17 ||  || 3–0 || 11–1 || –
|- align="center" bgcolor="#ddffdd"
| March 17 ||  || 4–1 || 12–1 || –
|- align="center" bgcolor="#ddffdd"
| March 18 || Colorado State || 11–0 || 13–1 || –
|- align="center" bgcolor="#ffdddd"
| March 20 ||  || 1–5 || 13–2 || –
|- align="center" bgcolor="#ffdddd"
| March 21 || Oregon State || 5–7 || 13–3 || –
|- align="center" bgcolor="#ddffdd"
| March 22 || Oregon State || 7–3 || 14–3 || –
|- align="center" bgcolor="#ddffdd"
| March 23 || Colorado State || 10–9 || 15–3 || –
|- align="center" bgcolor="#ddffdd"
| March 24 ||  || 16–3 || 16–3 || –
|- align="center" bgcolor="#ddffdd"
| March 25 || Colorado || 15–2 || 17–3 || –
|- align="center" bgcolor="#ddffdd"
| March 27 ||  || 3–2 || 18–3 || –
|- align="center" bgcolor="#ddffdd"
| March 28 || Oklahoma || 1–0 || 19–3 || –
|- align="center" bgcolor="#ddffdd"
| March 30 || Oklahoma || 9–2 || 20–3 || –
|- align="center" bgcolor="#ddffdd"
| March 31 || Oklahoma || 13–2 || 21–3 || –
|-

|- align="center" bgcolor="#ddffdd"
| April 3 ||  || 5–4 || 22–3 || –
|- align="center" bgcolor="#ddffdd"
| April 4 || Utah State || 20–6 || 23–3 || –
|- align="center" bgcolor="#ddffdd"
| April 5 || Utah State || 12–1 || 24–3 || –
|- align="center" bgcolor="#ddffdd"
| April 6 ||  || 12–3 || 25–3 || –
|- align="center" bgcolor="#ddffdd"
| April 7 || Wyoming || 5–1 || 26–3 || –
|- align="center" bgcolor="#ddffdd"
| April 8 || Wyoming || 1–0 || 27–3 || –
|- align="center" bgcolor="#ddffdd"
| April 8 || Wyoming || 4–0 || 28–3 || –
|- align="center" bgcolor="#ddffdd"
| April 12 ||  || 5–4 || 29–3 || –
|- align="center" bgcolor="#ffdddd"
| April 14 || at  ||  0–6 || 29–4 || 0–1
|- align="center" bgcolor="#ffdddd"
| April 15 || at Arizona ||  2–3 || 29–5 || 0–2
|- align="center" bgcolor="#ddffdd"
| April 15 || at Arizona ||  3–0 || 30–5 || 1–2
|- align="center" bgcolor="#ffdddd"
| April 21 || California Western || 3–13 || 30–6 || –
|- align="center" bgcolor="#ddffdd"
| April 22 || California Western || 6–5 || 31–6 || –
|- align="center" bgcolor="#ddffdd"
| April 22 || California Western || 6–5 || 32–6 || –
|- align="center" bgcolor="#ddffdd"
| April 26 || at Grand Canyon || 4–2 || 33–6 || –
|- align="center" bgcolor="#ffdddd"
| April 28 || at  || 2–5 || 33–7 || 1–3
|- align="center" bgcolor="#ffdddd"
| April 29 || at New Mexico || 13–17 || 33–8 || 1–4
|- align="center" bgcolor="#ddffdd"
| April 29 || at New Mexico || 9–2 || 34–8 || 2–4
|-

|- align="center" bgcolor="#ddffdd"
| May 5 ||  || 10–0 || 35–8 || –
|- align="center" bgcolor="#ddffdd"
| May 6 || San Diego || 1–0 || 36–8 || –
|- align="center" bgcolor="#ddffdd"
| May 6 || San Diego || 11–1 || 37–8 || –
|- align="center" bgcolor="#ddffdd"
| May 9 || Grand Canyon || 6–2 || 38–8 || –
|- align="center" bgcolor="#ddffdd"
| May 12 || New Mexico || 7–2 || 39–8 || 3–4
|- align="center" bgcolor="#ddffdd"
| May 13 || New Mexico || 3–2 || 40–8 || 4–4
|- align="center" bgcolor="#ddffdd"
| May 13 || New Mexico || 8–3 || 41–8 || 5–4
|- align="center" bgcolor="#ddffdd"
| May 19 || Arizona || 3–0 || 42–8 || 6–4
|- align="center" bgcolor="#ddffdd"
| May 20 || Arizona || 3–0 || 43–8 || 7–4
|- align="center" bgcolor="#ffdddd"
| May 20 || Arizona || 2–7 || 43–9 || 7–5
|-

|-
! style="background:#990033;color:white;"| Post-Season
|-

|- align="center" bgcolor="#ddffdd"
| May 21 || vs. Arizona || 3–2 || 44–9
|-

|- align="center" bgcolor="#ffdddd"
| May 26 || vs.  || 0–3 || 44–10
|- align="center" bgcolor="#ddffdd"
| May 27 || vs. BYU || 6–3 || 45–10
|- align="center" bgcolor="#ddffdd"
| May 28 || vs. BYU || 4–3 || 46–10
|-

|- align="center" bgcolor="ddffdd"
| June 2 || vs.  || 11–0 || 47–10
|- align="center" bgcolor="ffdddd"
| June 3 || vs. Air Force || 2–5 || 47–11
|- align="center" bgcolor="ddffdd"
| June 3 || vs. Air Force || 6–0 || 48–11
|-

|- align="center" bgcolor="ddffdd"
| June 12 || vs. Oklahoma State || Rosenblatt Stadium || 7–2 || 49–11
|- align="center" bgcolor="ddffdd"
| June 13 || vs. Boston College || Rosenblatt Stadium || 8–1 || 50–11
|- align="center" bgcolor="ddffdd"
| June 14 || vs. Stanford || Rosenblatt Stadium || 5–3 || 51–11
|- align="center" bgcolor="ffdddd"
| June 16 || vs. Houston || Rosenblatt Stadium || 0–3 || 51–12
|- align="center" bgcolor="ddffdd"
| June 17 || vs. Stanford || Rosenblatt Stadium || 4–3 || 52–12
|- align="center" bgcolor="ddffdd"
| June 18 || vs. Houston || Rosenblatt Stadium || 11–2 || 53–12
|-

Awards and honors 
Randy Bobb
 First Team All-WAC

Ron Davini
 College World Series Most Outstanding Player
 First Team All-WAC

Gary Gentry
 College World Series All-Tournament Team
 The Sporting News Player of the Year
 First Team All-American
 First Team All-WAC
 Dave Grangaard
 College World Series All-Tournament Team

Jack Lind
 College World Series All-Tournament Team

Scott Reid
 College World Series All-Tournament Team
 First Team All-American
 First Team All-WAC

References 

Arizona State Sun Devils baseball seasons
College World Series seasons
NCAA Division I Baseball Championship seasons
Arizona State
Western Athletic Conference baseball champion seasons